City of Knowledge Islamic School is an Islamic K-12 school in Pomona, California.

It was established in 1994, with 19 students, by Iraqi immigrants in the Los Angeles area who wanted to preserve Islamic customs among their youth. By 1998 the school had 150 students. That year the school had intentions of creating a gymnasium, a theater, and a center for student assembly. Western Association of Schools and Colleges began accrediting it in 2001.

The Assadiq Foundation is associated with the school.

References

External links

Private K-12 schools in California
Pomona, California
Islamic schools in California
1994 establishments in California
Educational institutions established in 1994